The fourth season of the American television series MacGyver consisting of 19 episodes. The series began on October 31, 1988 and ended on May 15, 1989 while it aired on the ABC network. The first season of the series to be broadcast in stereo. The region 1 DVD was released on December 6, 2005.

Episodes

References

External links 
 
 

1988 American television seasons
1989 American television seasons
MacGyver (1985 TV series) seasons